Robert C. Freeman is a professor of Church History and Doctrine at Brigham Young University (BYU) where he has taught for over 20 years. Freeman is the director of the Saints at War Project which he co-founded with colleague Dr. Dennis A. Wright. Research of the project has resulted in a series of volumes documenting the contributions of Latter-day Saints in the military during wartime.  Bob Freeman has contributed to eight volumes on this theme including World War II, Korea, Vietnam, and conflicts of the nineteenth century. Freeman and Wright are also credited with producing several documentary works on war related subjects as well. Bob Freeman and his wife JaNeal have also recently completed work on a history of the community of Springville. Freeman has authored numerous professional articles and has presented at various professional conferences of historians.

Freeman served a mission for the Church of Jesus Christ of Latter-day Saints in London, England.  He earned his undergraduate degree at BYU and his Juris Doctor degree at Western State University.  He worked for many years for the Church Educational System and has been a professor at BYU since 1996.

Freeman and his wife Ja Neal have seven children and several grandchildren.

Sources
Dust jacket bio from Saints at War.
FARMS bio
info on German Saints at War
Mormon Times, Aug. 18, 2008

20th-century Mormon missionaries
Latter Day Saints from Utah
American Mormon missionaries in England
Brigham Young University alumni
Brigham Young University faculty
Church Educational System instructors
Living people
Year of birth missing (living people)